Pararrhynchium is a Palearctic and Indomalayan genus of potter wasps.

Species
The following species are currently classified in Pararrhynchium:

Pararrhynchium ishigakiensis (Yasumatsu, 1933)
Pararrhynchium oceanicum Sk. Yamane, 1990
Pararrhynchium ornatum (Smith, 1852)
Pararrhynchium paradoxum (Gussakovsky, 1933)
Pararrhynchium sinense (Schulthess, 1913)
Pararrhynchium smithii (Saussure, 1856)
Pararrhynchium taiwanum Kim & Yamane, 2007
Pararrhynchium tsunekii Tano & Yam., 1983
Pararrhynchium unifasciatum Gusenleitner, 1998

References

 Vecht, J.v.d. & J.M. Carpenter. 1990. A Catalogue of the genera of the Vespidae (Hymenoptera). Zoologische Verhandelingen 260: 3 - 62.

Biological pest control wasps
Potter wasps